Larry Olsen may refer to:
Larry Olsen (jockey) (born 1948), Australian jockey and reporter for Sky News Australia
Larry C. Olsen (born 1937), materials scientist
Larry Olsen (actor), in Casanova Brown
Larry Olsen, co-founder of the Society of Janus

See also
Lawrence Olsen, Canadian politician